Bad Peterstal-Griesbach is a municipality in the district of Ortenau in Baden-Württemberg in Germany.

Matthias Erzberger was murdered here on August 26, 1921, for signing the 1918 Armistice for the German Empire.

Two former military fortifications are located in Zuflucht, a village in Bad Peterstal-Griesbach: the Schwedenschanze (Zuflucht) and the Röschenschanze. They are two of the many military protection forces in the history of the Black Forest, which were created since the Thirty Years' War (1618–1648) mainly to repel French troops.

See also 

 Black Forest

References

External links
 
Relief map of the Schwedenschanze and the Röschenschanze

Ortenaukreis
Spa towns in Germany